The 2010 FIM Czech Republic Speedway Grand Prix was the third race of the 2010 Speedway Grand Prix season. It took place on 22 May at the Stadium Marketa in Prague, Czech Republic.

The Grand Prix was won by Pole Tomasz Gollob, who beat Nicki Pedersen, Jarosław Hampel and Magnus Zetterström in the final.

Starting positions draw 

The Speedway Grand Prix Commission nominated Matěj Kůs as Wild Card, and Luboš Tomíček, Jr. and Zdeněk Simota both as Track Reserves. The Draw was made on 21 May at 13:00 CEST by Tomáš Chalupa, the Mayor  of the municipal district Prague 6.

Heat details

Heat after heat 
 Woffinden, Andersen, Kůs, Crump
 Jonsson, Hampel, Harris, Holta
 Bjerre, Zetterström, Hancock, Holder
 Lindgren, Sayfutdinov, Gollob, Pedersen
 Holder, Andersen, Gollob, Harris (T/start)
 Pedersen, Hampel, Zetterström, Kůs
 Hancock, Holta, Crump, Lindgren
 Sayfutdinov, Jonsson, Woffinden, Bjerre
 Hampel, Andersen, Hancock, Sayfutdinov
 Bjerre, Lindgren, Kůs, Harris
 Jonsson, Pedersen, Holder, Crump (F2)
 Gollob, Zetterström, Woffinden, Holta
 Bjerre, Holta, Andersen, Tomíček (Pedersen - T)
 Gollob, Jonsson, Hancock, Kůs
 Crump, Zetterström, Harris, Sayfutdinov (F4x)
 Hampel, Lindgren, Holder, Woffinden
 Jonsson, Zetterström, Andersen, Simota (Lindgren - T)
 Holta, Holder, Kůs, Tomíček (F3x)
 Crump, Bjerre, Hampel, Gollob
 Pedersen, Harris, Hancock, Woffinden
 Semi-Finals:
 Gollob, Zetterström, Andersen, Jonsson (F3x)
 Hampel, Pedersen, Bjerre, Crump
 The Final:
 Gollob, Pedersen, Hampel, Zetterström

The intermediate classification

See also 
 motorcycle speedway

References 

Czech Republic
2010